French units could refer to any of:

 Units of measurement in France before the French Revolution, used in France until 1795.
 Mesures usuelles, used in France until 1839.
 The International System of Units, the present-day metric system of units.
 The French catheter scale, used for measuring the diameters of medical catheters.

See also
 Units of measurement in France